Qualiflyer was a frequent flyer program and, to some extent, an airline alliance created in April 1992 by Austrian Airlines, Crossair and Swissair. When Swissair began acquiring stakes in other European airlines in 1998, Qualiflyer was extended to become their frequent flyer programs as well. This spawned the alliance known as The Qualiflyer Group. With the failure of Swissair in 2002, the group dissolved along with the program and a company was formed to give each former member airline an individual frequent-flyer program.

History

Qualiflyer was formed in April 1992, as Europe's first frequent-flyer program, for Swissair, Crossair and Austrian Airlines. Originally, Swissair's partner airline Crossair and its high-end hotel chain Swissôtel also participated in the program. Qualiflyer's affiliation to one of the world-class airlines caused membership to grow quickly to 2 million members in the first eight years. After that, other airlines joined in the program, and the program received even larger amounts of membership.

In 1998, Swissair, one of the more conservative European airlines, decided to have a hand at expansion. Instead of doing this by joining one of the new airlines alliances Star Alliance and oneworld and SkyTeam, it decided to acquire minority stakes in several airlines.  Among these were Sabena, TAP Air Portugal, Air Europe, and LOT Polish Airlines. These airlines all came to participate in the Qualiflyer program. The Qualiflyer Group would ultimately be a contributing factor in Swissair's demise.

Currently Swiss International Air Lines, the successor company of Swissair, is participating in the Miles & More frequent flyer program with Lufthansa.

Logo and livery
The Qualiflyer Group logo resembled a blue globe surrounded by two swooping arms. The entire globe was encircled by ten stars symbolizing the ten member airlines. Airlines participating in the group were required to fly airplanes with a rather large Qualiflyer logo sticker applied. Swissair and Sabena principally had several airplanes painted with a blue underbelly with "The Qualiflyer Group" titles applied near the nose.

Club levels
The Qualiflyer program always made a distinction between genuine frequent flyers and other traveling members. That is why, when Qualiflyer launched in 1992, two account types were introduced: the Qualiflyer basic level, for everyone wishing to collect miles, and the Qualiflyer Travelclub, for more frequent travelers. To meet the needs of particular target groups better, further club levels were added. The Travelclub Gold, for very frequent travelers and Qualiflyer Circle for an exclusive group of selected members. The existence of the "Circle" was not actively communicated, to ensure optimum exclusivity. The Circle was introduced in 1994 and the Travelclub Gold membership only many years later in 2001. For every level, further benefits were offered.

Member airlines
The following airlines were at one point members of the Qualiflyer Group or partners of just the frequent flyer program:

Awards
Qualiflyer won industry awards in a wide range of categories.

Freddie Awards

 1997
 Gold for best flight reward
 Gold for best accrual bonus

 2000
 3rd best newsletter
 3rd best program for spending miles

 2001
 2nd best award redemption
 2nd best program for spending miles
 3rd best frequent flyer program of the year
 3rd best accrual bonus
 3rd best credit card partnership

 2002
 2nd best frequent flyer program of the year
 2nd best award redemption
 3rd best newsletter
 3rd best website

Swiss Dialogue Marketing Awards
This award honors the best dialogue marketing campaigns and is selected by a jury of dialogue marketing experts.
 2002
 Gold award for relaunch of the Qualiflyer Circle welcome kit
 Silver award for launch of Travelclub Gold

References

External links
 Qualiflyer Website (Archive)

Products introduced in 1992
2002 disestablishments in Switzerland
Airline alliances
Defunct companies of Switzerland
Swissair
Frequent flyer programs